Ha Chang-duk (born 5 February 1982) is a South Korean fencer. He competed in the individual and team foil events at the 2004 Summer Olympics.

References

External links
 

1982 births
Living people
South Korean male foil fencers
Olympic fencers of South Korea
Fencers at the 2004 Summer Olympics
Asian Games medalists in fencing
Fencers at the 2006 Asian Games
Asian Games silver medalists for South Korea
Medalists at the 2006 Asian Games
Universiade medalists in fencing
Universiade silver medalists for South Korea